Woodside is an unincorporated community in Oregon County, in the U.S. state of Missouri. The community was located on Missouri Route 19 approximately three miles north of Alton.

History
A post office called Woodside was established in 1856, and remained in operation until 1916. The community has the name of J. R. Woodside, a pioneer settler.

References

Unincorporated communities in Oregon County, Missouri
Unincorporated communities in Missouri